The Damned is a 1969 historical drama film directed and co-written by Luchino Visconti, and starring Dirk Bogarde, Ingrid Thulin, Helmut Berger, Helmut Griem, Umberto Orsini, Charlotte Rampling, Florinda Bolkan, Reinhard Kolldehoff and Albrecht Schönhals in his final film. Set in 1930s Germany, the film centers on the Essenbecks, a wealthy industrialist family who have begun doing business with the Nazi Party, and whose amoral and unstable heir, Martin (played by Berger in his breakthrough role), is embroiled in his family's machinations. It is loosely based on the Krupp family of steel industrialists from Essen.

Principal photography of The Damned took place in locations throughout Italy, West Germany, and Austria. The film opened to widespread critical acclaim, but also faced controversy from ratings boards for its sexual content, including depictions of homosexuality, pedophilia, rape, and incest. In the United States, the film was given an X rating by the MPAA and was only lowered to a more-marketable R after twelve minutes of offending footage were cut.

Visconti won the Nastro d'Argento for Best Director, and was nominated for a Best Original Screenplay Oscar with co-writers Nicola Badalucco and Enrico Medioli. Helmut Berger received a Golden Globe nomination for Most Promising Newcomer. The film won the Golden Peacock (Best Film) at the 4th International Film Festival of India.

Plot
In 1930s Germany, the Essenbecks are a wealthy and powerful industrialist family who have begun doing business with the newly elected Nazi Party. On the night of the Reichstag fire in early 1933, the family's conservative patriarch, Baron Joachim von Essenbeck, who represents the old aristocratic Germany and detests Adolf Hitler, is celebrating his birthday. The celebration features the family's children performing for the Baron, his family and guests on a makeshift stage. While grandnephew Günther performs a piece of music on his cello, grandson Martin performs a drag performance that is interrupted by news that the Reichstag has been burned.

Martin's possessive mother (and Joachim's widowed daughter-in-law), Sophie, has been secretly carrying on a longstanding affair with Friedrich Bruckmann, an executive of the family's steelworks. Her father-in-law tacitly demands that Sophie never remarry and both fear that if their relationship were to be exposed, Sophie would be disowned and Friedrich fired. Friedrich is friendly with a cousin of Sophie's dead husband, an SS leader named Aschenbach. Aschenbach is aware that Friedrich seeks the title of Baron; he is also aware that the Baron has split control over the company in his will: his unscrupulous nephew, the boorish SA officer Konstantin, will inherit the company but Martin will inherit enough shares of stock to give him de facto control over the direction the company takes.

Acting on Aschenbach's previous statements that things would be better if the anti-Nazi Joachim was to die, Friederich kills Joachim and frames the outspoken Herbert Thalmann for the crime by using his personal handgun secured by Sophie. Herbert narrowly escapes abroad, but in his haste is forced to leave behind his wife and children. When his wife, Elizabeth, visits Sophie for help clearing her husband's name, Sophie denounces her by telling her that the Germany of old is dead. Sophie seemingly makes arrangements for Elizabeth and her daughters to join Herbert in exile and they are depicted reaching a train station, but it is later revealed that they are actually arrested and sent to Dachau, characterized in the film as an internment camp.

Aschenbach convinces Friedrich and Martin to embargo their company from selling weapons to the SA, as the SS is seeking to marginalize the rival group in order to encourage the Reichswehr's generals to go over to Hitler's side. Konstantin discovers that Martin has been sexually abusing his nieces and also Lisa Keller, a poor Jewish girl, who eventually commits suicide after Martin assaults her one night before visiting his girlfriend. Armed with this information, Konstantin blackmails Martin to resume providing the SA guns and ammunition and sends a letter detailing his crimes to Sophie so that she will get Friedrich to help provide cover for Martin in defying the SS. Hiding in the family's attic, Martin is confronted by Sophie, who agrees to help free Martin from Konstantin's blackmail. Sophie meets up with Aschenbach, who reveals that Hitler is planning on purging the SA and offers to destroy Konstantin's blackmail dossier for a future favor. In 1934, the SA – Konstantin among them – have a meeting at a hotel in Bad Wiessee to discuss their dissatisfaction with Hitler. The evening is depicted as a drunken celebration, ending with the male SA officers engaging in gay sex with one another. At dawn, the hotel is stormed by SS troops who slaughter various SA members. Konstantin is personally executed by Friedrich, whom Aschenbach brought along for the slaughter to ensure Konstantin's death.

Friedrich is now in charge of the family business, but Aschenbach is confronted by Sophie who demands that her father's last name and royal title of Baron be assigned to Friedrich so they can marry as equals. Aschenbach refuses and reminds Sophie that the Nazis want control over the steel and munitions business and will take it by force if the couple won't become willing servants to the Nazi Party. Meanwhile, Martin becomes furious as he realizes that the last remaining barriers keeping his mother from remarrying are gone and that Friedrich intends to take control over the family business for himself. Aschenbach offers Martin the destruction of his mother and her lover, after Martin confesses his hatred for them to Aschenbach.

During a family dinner, Friedrich and Aschenbach start arguing after Friedrich announces that Aschenbach, Günther, and Martin must submit themselves to the will and whims of the new head of the family. Aschenbach denounces Friedrich as a weak social climber and disloyal Nazi, as he brings a returning Herbert to the chamber. Herbert reveals that after Sophie arranged their arrest, Elizabeth and their children were sent to Dachau concentration camp, where Elizabeth died. Aschenbach has offered to free Herbert's children in exchange for Herbert's false confession to Joachim's death, though it's left ambiguous whether or not Aschenbach carries out his side of the bargain. He also reveals that Friedrich killed Konstantin (implying that Konstanin's role in the SA purge was covered up and his death reported as a random murder), turning Günther against Friedrich and radicalizes him to the Nazi cause.

Martin afterwards sexually assaults his mother, who subsequently falls into a catatonic state much to Friedrich's horror. Now a part of the SS, Martin allows Friedrich, who by decree has inherited the name and title of von Essenbeck, to wed his mother before ordering the two to take cyanide capsules, which they willingly consume, killing them both. Aschenbach, who now has complete control over Martin, becomes the effective heir to the von Essenbeck steelworks, leaving the empire under Nazi control.

Cast

"The German Trilogy"
The Damned has been regarded as the first of Visconti's films described as "The German Trilogy", followed by Death in Venice (1971) and Ludwig (1973). Author Henry Bacon, in his book Visconti: Explorations of Beauty and Decay (1998), specifically categorizes these films together in a chapter "Visconti & Germany".

Visconti's earlier films had analyzed Italian society during the Risorgimento and postwar periods. Peter Bondanella's Italian Cinema (2002) depicts the trilogy as a move to take a broader view of European politics and culture. Stylistically, "they emphasize lavish sets and costumes, sensuous lighting, painstakingly slow camerawork, and a penchant for imagery reflecting subjective states or symbolic values", comments Bondanella.

Production

The film was shot on-location in West Germany, Austria, and Italy; and at Cinecittà Studios in Rome. Locations included Attersee Lake, Düsseldorf, Essen, Unterach am Attersee (doubling for Bad Wiessee), and the steelworks at Terni.

The Damned was the breakthrough role for Helmut Berger, who is given an "Introducing" credit (though he had already appeared in Visconti's segment of The Witches). At the time, Berger was in a romantic relationship with Visconti. Dirk Bogarde later expressed disappointment with Visconti for sacrificing his character's development in lieu of a greater focus on Berger's. In his memoirs, Bogarde specifically cites a long scene showing Friedrich immediately after murdering Joachim, instantly becoming overwhelmed with guilt, which was filmed but cut.

Composer Maurice Jarre was hired by the producers without Visconti's knowledge, who originally wanted the film scored entirely with pre-existing classical music by Gustav Mahler and Richard Wagner. He was reportedly dissatisfied with the composer's efforts, which he compared disparagingly to his work for Doctor Zhivago, but was forced to include his compositions due to contractual obligations.

The character "Aschenbach" was named for the protagonist of Thomas Mann's Death in Venice, which Visconti later adapted into a 1971 film of the same name.

Editing

After the first screening of the film, 12 minutes were cut, including a scene where a young Jewish girl hangs herself after being molested. The US version additionally cut much of the Bad Wiessee and subsequent Night of the Long Knives sequence. The footage was later restored on the 2004 DVD release, albeit in German, and is also present with English/German or Italian audio tracks in the 2021 Criterion Collection DVD and blu-ray release.

The film was given an "X" rating by the MPAA due to a nude incest scene. Warner Bros. submitted the film for re-classification for its DVD release of the film in 2004. The film's rating was changed from an "X" to an "R".

The film was heavily edited when shown on CBS television late at night, leading one executive to joke that the film should be retitled The Darned. This technically made it the first X-rated film to be shown on American network television.

In the English-language version, Umberto Orsini's voice is re-dubbed by an uncredited actor, due to his thick Italian accent.

Reception
The film opened to worldwide acclaim. It received an Oscar nomination for Best Original Screenplay and was named Best Foreign Film by the National Board of Review. Among the international cast, Helmut Berger was singled out for his performance as Martin, a vicious sexual deviant who uses his amoral appetites to his own twisted ends. The film was the tenth-most popular movie at the French box office in 1970.

The film has appeared on critics' lists such as the New York Times Best 1000 Movies Ever Made and Halliwell's Top 1000: The Ultimate Movie Countdown.

The film's entry in the Lexikon des Internationalen Films praises it for its presentation of the connection of "moral decadence, sexual neurosis, aestheticist death wish, narcissist self-centeredness and political opportunism", also saying that the effect is partially weakened by the film's "decorative circuitousness and artificial stylisation".

Filmmaker Rainer Werner Fassbinder has called The Damned his favorite film. He called it "perhaps the greatest film, the film that I think means as much to the history of film as Shakespeare to the history of theater".

Home media
The Damned was released on DVD by Warner Home Video in 2004. A 2K restoration of the film by the Cineteca di Bologna and Institut Lumière was released on Blu-ray and DVD by the Criterion Collection on 28 September 2021.

Notes

References

External links
 
  – entire film in English

1969 films
1969 drama films
1969 LGBT-related films
1960s business films
1960s English-language films
1960s German-language films
English-language German films
English-language Italian films
Italian drama films
Italian epic films
Italian LGBT-related films
German drama films
German epic films
German LGBT-related films
West German films
Cross-dressing in film
Films à clef
Films about child sexual abuse
Films about dysfunctional families
Films about Nazi Germany
Films about Nazis
Films about pedophilia
Films about rape
Films about suicide
Films directed by Luchino Visconti
Films scored by Maurice Jarre
Films set in Germany
Films shot in Austria
Films shot in Germany
Films shot in Italy
Films shot at Cinecittà Studios
Incest in film
Warner Bros. films
Films set in 1933
Films set in 1934
1960s Italian films
1960s German films